Jane Huffman (born 1992 Livonia, Michigan) is an American poet. She has a BA in theatre arts and English from Kalamazoo College and an MFA from the Iowa Writers' Workshop. She has taught at the University of Iowa at the Magid Center for Undergraduate Writing and worked at Prairie Lights Bookstore. She is Editor-in-Chief of Guesthouse and the Grants and Funding Manager for the Iowa Youth Writing Project. Formerly, she was Staff Director for Sundress Publications and Assistant Editor of 2014 Best of the Net Anthology.

Awards and honors 

 2019 Ruth Lilly and Dorothy Sargent Rosenberg Poetry Fellowship

Residencies 

 2018 Willapa Bay Artist-in-Residence

Published works

Poems 

 "The Rest." Poetry. December 2019.
 "Revision." Poetry. December 2019.
 "Surety." Poetry. December 2019.
 "The Worm." Gulf Coast. Fall 2019.
 "Returning." Gulf Coast. Fall 2019.
 "Of Habit." West Branch. Winter 2019.
 "Sestina, Spiraling." West Branch. Winter 2019.
 "Chasteness, a Gesture." West Branch. Winter 2019.
 "Failed Sestina." Poetry. March 2019.
 "The Mosquito." The Columbia Review. Spring 2019.
 "Cove Octave." The Columbia Review. Spring 2019.
 "The Waves, Parts 1 and 2." The Columbia Review. Spring 2019.
 "At Present." The Adroit Journal. January 2019.
 "Rip." The Iowa Review. 2019.
 "Sestina, Unfinished." Washington Square Review. Fall 2018.
 "Ode." The New Yorker. August, 2018.
 "Sestina with Six Titles." TYPO. April, 2018.
 "Sonnet as Soft Form." Muzzle. June 2018. 
 "Sonnet with Gaping Holes." Ninth Letter. 2018.
 "A Theory." Phoebe. Spring 2018.
 "Double Sonnet." FIELD. 2018.
 "Everything Reduced to One Plan." Third Coast. 2018.
 "Sonnet within a Sonnet." Hobart. November, 2017.
 "Sonnet with Slow Swirl at the Edge of the Sea." Hobart. November, 2017.
 "Anti-Etude." Hobart. November, 2017.
 "Sestina, Spilling Over." Witness. Winter 2017.
"Sonnet with Simile." Concis. Winter 2017.
 "Thesis." Slice Magazine. Spring/Summer 2017.
 "Mirror in the Green Room." The Adroit Journal. 2016.
 "Peonies." Breakwater Review. September 2016.
 "Van Gogh, a Venn Diagram." Witness. Summer 2016.
 "Spanish Riding School." The Common. May 2016.
 "I never stopped wearing the uniform." The Common. May 2016.
 "I approach the edge, the edge greets me warmly." Phantom Limb. 2016.
 "Mare Skull." Radar Poetry. 2015.
"Shaft." Arroyo Literary Review. 2015.
"Cleopatra III." Moon City Review. 2015.
 "Conjuring." The Boiler. 2014.
 "1992." SOFTBLOW.
 "The Prayer of Agreement." SOFTBLOW.
 "Untitled Psalm." SOFTBLOW.
 "Pierre Bonnard's Parakeet." [http://www.softblow.org/ SOFTBLOW.
 "Cooling, Nights with the Box Fan in the Window aren't Bad." Tinderbox.

References

External links 
 http://www.kzoo.edu/belight/article/how-to-grow-a-poet/

1992 births
Living people
Poets from Michigan
Kalamazoo College alumni
Iowa Writers' Workshop alumni
University of Iowa faculty
Writers from Detroit
American women poets
American women academics
21st-century American women